The 1960 Philadelphia Phillies season was the 78th in franchise history. The team finished in eighth place in the National League with a record of 59–95, 36 games behind the NL and World Series Champion Pittsburgh Pirates.

Offseason 
 November 30, 1959: Clay Dalrymple was drafted by the Phillies from the Milwaukee Braves in the 1959 rule 5 draft.
 December 4, 1959: Carl Sawatski was traded by the Phillies to the St. Louis Cardinals for Bill Smith and Bob Smith.
 December 5, 1959: Chico Fernández and Ray Semproch were traded by the Phillies to the Detroit Tigers for Ted Lepcio, Ken Walters and Alex Cosmidis (minors).
 December 9, 1959: Gene Freese was traded by the Phillies to the Chicago White Sox for Johnny Callison.
 March 1960: Jim Bolger was purchased from the Phillies by the Milwaukee Braves.

Regular season 
Manager Eddie Sawyer abruptly resigned after the season opener. The Phillies hired Gene Mauch as his replacement, but coach Andy Cohen managed one game before Mauch could join the team from the Minneapolis Millers, leading the Phillies to a 5–4 win in ten innings over the Milwaukee Braves. This was the only game Cohen ever managed in the major leagues, leaving him with a perfect record as a manager.

Season standings

Record vs. opponents

Notable transactions 
 May 12, 1960: Dave Philley was purchased from the Phillies by the San Francisco Giants.
 May 13, 1960: Don Cardwell and Ed Bouchee were traded by the Phillies to the Chicago Cubs for Tony Taylor and Cal Neeman.
 June 15, 1960: Wally Post, Harry Anderson, and Fred Hopke (minors) were traded by the Phillies to the Cincinnati Reds for Tony González and Lee Walls.
 July 16, 1960: Costen Shockley was signed as an amateur free agent by the Phillies.
 September 13, 1960: Mike Marshall was signed as an amateur free agent by the Phillies.
 September 21, 1960: Adolfo Phillips was signed as an amateur free agent by the Phillies.

Game log

|- style="background:#fbb"
| 1 || April 12 || @ Reds || 4–9 || Brooks Lawrence (1–0) || Robin Roberts (0–1) || Bill Henry (1) || 30,075 || 0–1
|- style="background:#bfb"
| 2 || April 14 || Braves || 5–4 (10) || Don Cardwell (1–0) || Juan Pizarro (0–1) || None || 32,038 || 1–1
|- style="background:#fbb"
| 3 || April 16 || Braves || 3–13 || Lew Burdette (1–0) || John Buzhardt (0–1) || None || 9,077 || 1–2
|- style="background:#fbb"
| 4 || April 17 || Braves || 4–8 || Bob Buhl (1–0) || Robin Roberts (0–2) || None || 6,632 || 1–3
|- style="background:#bfb"
| 5 || April 19 || @ Pirates || 4–3 || Jim Owens (1–0) || Harvey Haddix (0–1) || None || 11,443 || 2–3
|- style="background:#fbb"
| 6 || April 20 || @ Pirates || 2–4 || Vern Law (2–0) || Don Cardwell (1–1) || None || 10,403 || 2–4
|- style="background:#fbb"
| 7 || April 21 || @ Pirates || 5–11 || Fred Green (1–0) || Humberto Robinson (0–1) || Roy Face (1) || 9,451 || 2–5
|- style="background:#bfb"
| 8 || April 22 || Reds || 10–7 || Robin Roberts (1–2) || Jay Hook (1–1) || Rubén Gómez (1) || 12,254 || 3–5
|- style="background:#bfb"
| 9 || April 23 || Reds || 3–2 (13) || Turk Farrell (1–0) || Bill Henry (0–1) || None || 5,168 || 4–5
|- style="background:#bfb"
| 10 || April 24 (1) || Reds || 9–5 || Chris Short (1–0) || Bob Purkey (0–1) || Turk Farrell (1) || see 2nd game || 5–5
|- style="background:#fbb"
| 11 || April 24 (2) || Reds || 4–10 || Don Newcombe (1–0) || Jim Owens (1–1) || Jim Brosnan (1) || 19,873 || 5–6
|- style="background:#bbb"
| – || April 26 || Pirates || colspan=6 | Postponed (rain); Makeup: July 8 as a traditional double-header
|- style="background:#fbb"
| 12 || April 27 || Pirates || 2–3 || Vern Law (3–0) || Jack Meyer (0–1) || None || 9,233 || 5–7
|- style="background:#fbb"
| 13 || April 28 || Pirates || 0–3 || Bob Friend (3–0) || John Buzhardt (0–2) || None || 8,789 || 5–8
|- style="background:#fbb"
| 14 || April 29 || @ Braves || 3–5 || Juan Pizarro (1–1) || Jim Owens (1–2) || Warren Spahn (1) || 12,480 || 5–9
|- style="background:#bbb"
| – || April 30 || @ Braves || colspan=6 | Postponed (rain); Makeup: August 18
|-

|- style="background:#fbb"
| 15 || May 1 || @ Braves || 4–5 || Lew Burdette (2–1) || Don Cardwell (1–2) || Don McMahon (1) || 17,884 || 5–10
|- style="background:#fbb"
| 16 || May 2 || @ Cubs || 7–8 || Ben Johnson (1–1) || Humberto Robinson (0–2) || None || 2,807 || 5–11
|- style="background:#bfb"
| 17 || May 3 || @ Cubs || 10–9 || Jack Meyer (1–1) || Glen Hobbie (2–2) || Turk Farrell (2) || 3,046 || 6–11
|- style="background:#fbb"
| 18 || May 4 || @ Cardinals || 3–5 || Marshall Bridges (2–0) || John Buzhardt (0–3) || Lindy McDaniel (4) || 6,226 || 6–12
|- style="background:#bfb"
| 19 || May 5 || @ Cardinals || 3–1 || Jim Owens (2–2) || Vinegar Bend Mizell (1–2) || None || 7,812 || 7–12
|- style="background:#bfb"
| 20 || May 6 || @ Dodgers || 6–1 (10) || Turk Farrell (2–0) || Sandy Koufax (0–2) || None || 20,165 || 8–12
|- style="background:#fbb"
| 21 || May 7 || @ Dodgers || 2–3 (11) || Larry Sherry (3–3) || Rubén Gómez (0–1) || None || 24,082 || 8–13
|- style="background:#bfb"
| 22 || May 8 || @ Dodgers || 4–2 || Jack Meyer (2–1) || Ed Rakow (0–1) || Turk Farrell (3) || 20,756 || 9–13
|- style="background:#fbb"
| 23 || May 10 || @ Giants || 2–4 || Stu Miller (1–1) || Gene Conley (0–1) || Billy O'Dell (1) || 20,304 || 9–14
|- style="background:#fbb"
| 24 || May 11 || @ Giants || 0–1 || Sam Jones (4–2) || Jim Owens (2–3) || None || 11,447 || 9–15
|- style="background:#fbb"
| 25 || May 12 || @ Giants || 0–1 || Jack Sanford (3–1) || Robin Roberts (1–3) || None || 10,849 || 9–16
|- style="background:#fbb"
| 26 || May 13 || @ Reds || 0–1 || Jim O'Toole (3–2) || Rubén Gómez (0–2) || None || 6,787 || 9–17
|- style="background:#bfb"
| 27 || May 14 || @ Reds || 5–2 || Jack Meyer (3–1) || Jay Hook (3–3) || Turk Farrell (4) || 4,239 || 10–17
|- style="background:#bfb"
| 28 || May 15 (1) || @ Reds || 14–3 || Gene Conley (1–1) || Cal McLish (2–3) || None || see 2nd game || 11–17
|- style="background:#fbb"
| 29 || May 15 (2) || @ Reds || 1–5 || Don Newcombe (2–1) || Humberto Robinson (0–3) || Bill Henry (6) || 17,860 || 11–18
|- style="background:#fbb"
| 30 || May 16 || Cardinals || 3–5 || Ernie Broglio (1–1) || Jim Owens (2–4) || None || 11,321 || 11–19
|- style="background:#bbb"
| – || May 17 || Cardinals || colspan=6 | Postponed (rain); Makeup: August 9 as a traditional double-header
|- style="background:#bbb"
| – || May 18 || Cubs || colspan=6 | Postponed (rain); Makeup: June 21 as a traditional double-header
|- style="background:#fbb"
| 31 || May 19 || Cubs || 2–4 || Bob Anderson (1–1) || Robin Roberts (1–4) || None || 12,297 || 11–20
|- style="background:#bfb"
| 32 || May 20 || Dodgers || 6–3 || Gene Conley (2–1) || Johnny Podres (2–4) || None || 18,681 || 12–20
|- style="background:#bbb"
| – || May 21 || Dodgers || colspan=6 | Postponed (rain); Makeup: June 29 as a traditional double-header
|- style="background:#fbb"
| 33 || May 22 || Dodgers || 6–9 || Ed Roebuck (2–1) || Rubén Gómez (0–3) || Don Drysdale (1) || 12,780 || 12–21
|- style="background:#fbb"
| 34 || May 24 || Giants || 0–4 || Sam Jones (5–3) || Jim Owens (2–5) || None || 20,529 || 12–22
|- style="background:#fbb"
| 35 || May 25 || Giants || 1–5 (8) || Mike McCormick (6–2) || Robin Roberts (1–5) || None || 17,713 || 12–23
|- style="background:#fbb"
| 36 || May 26 || Giants || 0–9 || Jack Sanford (5–1) || Gene Conley (2–2) || None || 14,386 || 12–24
|- style="background:#bbb"
| – || May 27 || @ Pirates || colspan=6 | Postponed (rain); Makeup: August 16 as a traditional double-header
|- style="background:#fbb"
| 37 || May 28 || @ Pirates || 2–4 (13) || Jim Umbricht (1–2) || Turk Farrell (2–1) || None || 9,476 || 12–25
|- style="background:#fbb"
| 38 || May 29 || @ Pirates || 5–8 || Vern Law (7–1) || Robin Roberts (1–6) || Fred Green (2) || 15,704 || 12–26
|- style="background:#fbb"
| 39 || May 30 (1) || Reds || 4–5 (10) || Jim Brosnan (3–0) || Gene Conley (2–3) || Bob Grim (1) || see 2nd game || 12–27
|- style="background:#bfb"
| 40 || May 30 (2) || Reds || 6–1 || John Buzhardt (1–3) || Don Newcombe (3–2) || None || 20,323 || 13–27
|- style="background:#bfb"
| 41 || May 31 || Braves || 12–7 || Chris Short (2–0) || Lew Burdette (3–2) || Turk Farrell (5) || 8,155 || 14–27
|-

|- style="background:#fbb"
| 42 || June 1 || Braves || 3–6 || Bob Buhl (4–2) || Robin Roberts (1–7) || None || 10,682 || 14–28
|- style="background:#fbb"
| 43 || June 2 || Braves || 8–9 || Warren Spahn (3–2) || Taylor Phillips (0–1) || Bob Rush (1) || 10,002 || 14–29
|- style="background:#fbb"
| 44 || June 3 || Pirates || 0–3 || Vern Law (8–1) || John Buzhardt (1–4) || None || 16,738 || 14–30
|- style="background:#bbb"
| – || June 4 || Pirates || colspan=6 | Postponed (rain); Makeup: September 20 as a traditional double-header
|- style="background:#bfb"
| 45 || June 5 (1) || Pirates || 2–0 || Gene Conley (3–3) || Bob Friend (6–3) || None || see 2nd game || 15–30
|- style="background:#bfb"
| 46 || June 5 (2) || Pirates || 4–1 || Jim Owens (3–5) || Harvey Haddix (3–2) || None || 23,410 || 16–30
|- style="background:#fbb"
| 47 || June 6 || @ Cardinals || 2–5 || Larry Jackson (7–5) || Chris Short (2–1) || None || 9,908 || 16–31
|- style="background:#bfb"
| 48 || June 7 || @ Cardinals || 5–3 || Robin Roberts (2–7) || Bob Miller (2–1) || Turk Farrell (6) || 9,635 || 17–31
|- style="background:#bfb"
| 49 || June 8 || @ Cardinals || 5–4 || John Buzhardt (2–4) || Lindy McDaniel (3–3) || None || 8,263 || 18–31
|- style="background:#fbb"
| 50 || June 10 || @ Cubs || 1–6 || Mark Freeman (1–0) || Jim Owens (3–6) || None || 5,077 || 18–32
|- style="background:#bfb"
| 51 || June 11 || @ Cubs || 7–1 || Chris Short (3–1) || Dick Ellsworth (3–3) || None || 13,166 || 19–32
|- style="background:#fbb"
| 52 || June 12 || @ Cubs || 7–8 (10) || Mark Freeman (2–0) || Humberto Robinson (0–4) || None || 8,481 || 19–33
|- style="background:#bfb"
| 53 || June 14 || @ Dodgers || 6–5 (10) || Turk Farrell (3–1) || Clem Labine (0–1) || None || 18,031 || 20–33
|- style="background:#fbb"
| 54 || June 15 || @ Dodgers || 2–14 || Sandy Koufax (2–8) || Jim Owens (3–7) || None || 13,295 || 20–34
|- style="background:#fbb"
| 55 || June 16 || @ Dodgers || 6–10 || Johnny Podres (6–5) || John Buzhardt (2–5) || Ed Roebuck (2) || 19,573 || 20–35
|- style="background:#fbb"
| 56 || June 17 || @ Giants || 3–7 || Mike McCormick (8–3) || Chris Short (3–2) || Billy Loes (3) || 20,952 || 20–36
|- style="background:#fbb"
| 57 || June 18 || @ Giants || 4–7 || Sam Jones (9–5) || Dallas Green (0–1) || Johnny Antonelli (2) || 19,494 || 20–37
|- style="background:#bfb"
| 58 || June 19 || @ Giants || 2–1 (11) || Robin Roberts (3–7) || Jack Sanford (6–4) || None || 32,159 || 21–37
|- style="background:#bfb"
| 59 || June 21 (1) || Cubs || 7–6 (13) || Turk Farrell (4–1) || Glen Hobbie (6–9) || None || see 2nd game || 22–37
|- style="background:#bfb"
| 60 || June 21 (2) || Cubs || 7–6 || John Buzhardt (3–5) || Joe Schaffernoth (0–2) || Robin Roberts (1) || 26,233 || 23–37
|- style="background:#bfb"
| 61 || June 22 || Cubs || 6–3 || Chris Short (4–2) || Bob Anderson (2–3) || None || 9,342 || 24–37
|- style="background:#bfb"
| 62 || June 23 || Cubs || 4–3 || Turk Farrell (5–1) || Seth Morehead (0–6) || None || 8,144 || 25–37
|- style="background:#bfb"
| 63 || June 24 || Cardinals || 4–3 || Robin Roberts (4–7) || Ernie Broglio (5–3) || None || 14,489 || 26–37
|- style="background:#fbb"
| 64 || June 25 || Cardinals || 0–1 || Curt Simmons (1–0) || Jim Owens (3–8) || Lindy McDaniel (13) || 7,660 || 26–38
|- style="background:#bfb"
| 65 || June 26 (1) || Cardinals || 3–2 (12) || John Buzhardt (4–5) || Ernie Broglio (5–4) || None || see 2nd game || 27–38
|- style="background:#fbb"
| 66 || June 26 (2) || Cardinals || 3–4 || Ernie Broglio (6–4) || Chris Short (4–3) || None || 19,998 || 27–39
|- style="background:#bfb"
| 67 || June 28|| Dodgers || 2–0 || Dallas Green (1–1) || Stan Williams (6–2) || None || 22,775 || 28–39
|- style="background:#fbb"
| 68 || June 29 (1) || Dodgers || 3–6 || Larry Sherry (6–4) || Turk Farrell (5–2) || None || see 2nd game || 28–40
|- style="background:#fbb"
| 69 || June 29 (2) || Dodgers || 2–5 || Sandy Koufax (3–8) || Gene Conley (3–4) || Ed Roebuck (3) || 25,572 || 28–41
|- style="background:#fbb"
| 70 || June 30 || Dodgers || 6–10 || Ed Roebuck (5–1) || Jim Owens (3–9) || None || 20,859 || 28–42
|-

|- style="background:#bbb"
| – || July 1 || Giants || colspan=6 | Postponed (rain); Makeup: August 2 as a traditional double-header
|- style="background:#bfb"
| 71 || July 2 || Giants || 3–2 (11) || Turk Farrell (6–2) || Mike McCormick (9–4) || None || 20,647 || 29–42
|- style="background:#fbb"
| 72 || July 3 || Giants || 5–11 || Sam Jones (10–7) || Chris Short (4–4) || Mike McCormick (2) || 15,700 || 29–43
|- style="background:#fbb"
| 73 || July 4 (1) || @ Reds || 0–5 || Jay Hook (7–7) || Dallas Green (1–2) || None || see 2nd game || 29–44
|- style="background:#bfb"
| 74 || July 4 (2) || @ Reds || 5–2 || Gene Conley (4–4) || Joe Nuxhall (1–4) || None || 15,280 || 30–44
|- style="background:#bfb"
| 75 || July 5 || @ Reds || 2–0 || Robin Roberts (5–7) || Don Newcombe (3–6) || None || 5,847 || 31–44
|- style="background:#bfb"
| 76 || July 6 || @ Braves || 8–5 (10) || Gene Conley (5–4) || Don McMahon (2–6) || None || 14,753 || 32–44
|- style="background:#fbb"
| 77 || July 7 || @ Braves || 0–2 || Warren Spahn (8–5) || Chris Short (4–5) || None || 14,983 || 32–45
|- style="background:#bfb"
| 78 || July 8 (1) || Pirates || 6–5 (10) || Turk Farrell (7–2) || Fred Green (4–3) || None || see 2nd game || 33–45
|- style="background:#fbb"
| 79 || July 8 (2) || Pirates || 3–8 || Bob Friend (10–5) || Dallas Green (1–3) || None || 36,056 || 33–46
|- style="background:#bfb"
| 80 || July 9 || Pirates || 2–1 || Gene Conley (6–4) || Vern Law (11–4) || None || 19,541 || 34–46
|- style="background:#fbb"
| 81 || July 10 || Pirates || 2–6 || Harvey Haddix (6–4) || Robin Roberts (5–8) || Roy Face (13) || 13,012 || 34–47
|- style="background:#bbcaff;"
| – || July 11 ||colspan="7" |1960 Major League Baseball All-Star Game at Municipal Stadium in Kansas City
|- style="background:#bbcaff;"
| – || July 13 ||colspan="7" |1960 Major League Baseball All-Star Game at Yankee Stadium in New York City
|- style="background:#fbb"
| 82 || July 15 || Braves || 5–7 || Warren Spahn (9–6) || Chris Short (4–6) || Ron Piché (4) || 19,429 || 34–48
|- style="background:#fbb"
| 83 || July 16 || Braves || 4–6 || Joey Jay (3–5) || Robin Roberts (5–9) || Don Nottebart (1) || 17,969 || 34–49
|- style="background:#fbb"
| 84 || July 17 || Braves || 3–7 || Lew Burdette (10–4) || Gene Conley (6–5) || None || 10,686 || 34–50
|- style="background:#fbb"
| 85 || July 19 || @ Giants || 0–2 || Juan Marichal (1–0) || John Buzhardt (4–6) || None || 13,279 || 34–51
|- style="background:#fbb"
| 86 || July 20 || @ Giants || 1–3 || Sam Jones (12–9) || Chris Short (4–7) || Johnny Antonelli (4) || 10,504 || 34–52
|- style="background:#bfb"
| 87 || July 21 || @ Giants || 3–0 || Robin Roberts (6–9) || Jack Sanford (8–8) || None || 9,561 || 35–52
|- style="background:#fbb"
| 88 || July 22 || @ Dodgers || 0–2 || Don Drysdale (8–10) || Gene Conley (6–6) || None || 21,335 || 35–53
|- style="background:#fbb"
| 89 || July 23 || @ Dodgers || 0–2 || Roger Craig (4–1) || Dallas Green (1–4) || None || 31,631 || 35–54
|- style="background:#fbb"
| 90 || July 24 || @ Dodgers || 0–9 || Stan Williams (10–2) || John Buzhardt (4–7) || None || 14,027 || 35–55
|- style="background:#bfb"
| 91 || July 26 || @ Cubs || 4–3 || Robin Roberts (7–9) || Glen Hobbie (9–13) || Turk Farrell (7) || 4,791 || 36–55
|- style="background:#bfb"
| 92 || July 27 || @ Cubs || 7–5 || Gene Conley (7–6) || Seth Morehead (1–7) || Turk Farrell (8) || 7,409 || 37–55
|- style="background:#bfb"
| 93 || July 28 || @ Cubs || 3–2 || Dallas Green (2–4) || Dick Ellsworth (4–8) || None || 5,442 || 38–55
|- style="background:#fbb"
| 94 || July 29 || @ Cardinals || 0–3 || Ernie Broglio (11–5) || John Buzhardt (4–8) || None || 14,028 || 38–56
|- style="background:#fbb"
| 95 || July 30 || @ Cardinals || 3–6 || Larry Jackson (13–8) || Chris Short (4–8) || None || 8,332 || 38–57
|- style="background:#fbb"
| 96 || July 31 (1) || @ Cardinals || 2–9 || Curt Simmons (3–1) || Gene Conley (7–7) || None || see 2nd game || 38–58
|- style="background:#fbb"
| 97 || July 31 (2) || @ Cardinals || 3–5 || Ray Sadecki (5–5) || Robin Roberts (7–10) || Lindy McDaniel (16) || 20,061 || 38–59
|-

|- style="background:#bfb"
| 98 || August 2 (1) || Giants || 7–3 || Dallas Green (3–4) || Jack Sanford (9–9) || Turk Farrell (9) || see 2nd game || 39–59
|- style="background:#bfb"
| 99 || August 2 (2) || Giants || 6–5 || Turk Farrell (8–2) || Stu Miller (3–4) || None || 26,276 || 40–59
|- style="background:#bfb"
| 100 || August 3 || Giants || 6–5 || Turk Farrell (9–2) || Billy Loes (3–2) || None || 11,169 || 41–59
|- style="background:#fbb"
| 101 || August 4 || Giants || 7–8 || Johnny Antonelli (4–6) || Jim Owens (3–10) || Stu Miller (1) || 12,876 || 41–60
|- style="background:#bbb"
| – || August 5 || Dodgers || colspan=6 | Postponed (rain); Makeup: August 7 as a traditional double-header
|- style="background:#bfb"
| 102 || August 6 || Dodgers || 3–1 || Robin Roberts (8–10) || Stan Williams (11–4) || None || 22,741 || 42–60
|- style="background:#fbb"
| 103 || August 7 (1) || Dodgers || 7–8 || Larry Sherry (9–8) || Turk Farrell (9–3) || None || see 2nd game || 42–61
|- style="background:#fbb"
| 104 || August 7 (2) || Dodgers || 1–2 || Sandy Koufax (4–8) || John Buzhardt (4–9) || None || 22,707 || 42–62
|- style="background:#fbb"
| 105 || August 9 (1) || Cardinals || 4–5 || Lindy McDaniel (9–3) || Dallas Green (3–5) || None || see 2nd game || 42–63
|- style="background:#fbb"
| 106 || August 9 (2) || Cardinals || 0–6 || Curt Simmons (4–2) || Gene Conley (7–8) || None || 21,312 || 42–64
|- style="background:#fbb"
| 107 || August 10 || Cardinals || 5–6 (10) || Lindy McDaniel (10–3) || Turk Farrell (9–4) || Ed Bauta (1) || 12,176 || 42–65
|- style="background:#bfb"
| 108 || August 12 || Cubs || 10–6 || Chris Short (5–8) || Glen Hobbie (10–16) || Turk Farrell (10) || 10,714 || 43–65
|- style="background:#fbb"
| 109 || August 13 || Cubs || 2–4 || Bob Anderson (6–7) || John Buzhardt (4–10) || Don Elston (9) || 2,533 || 43–66
|- style="background:#fbb"
| 110 || August 14 (1) || Cubs || 1–2 || Dick Ellsworth (6–8) || Gene Conley (7–9) || None || see 2nd game || 43–67
|- style="background:#fbb"
| 111 || August 14 (2) || Cubs || 3–7 || Moe Drabowsky (3–1) || Dallas Green (3–6) || Glen Hobbie (1) || 11,725 || 43–68
|- style="background:#bfb"
| 112 || August 15 || @ Pirates || 4–3 || Art Mahaffey (1–0) || Roy Face (6–6) || Chris Short (1) || 19,912 || 44–68
|- style="background:#fbb"
| 113 || August 16 (1) || @ Pirates || 2–11 || Bob Friend (13–9) || Jim Owens (3–11) || None || see 2nd game || 44–69
|- style="background:#fbb"
| 114 || August 16 (2) || @ Pirates || 3–4 || Roy Face (7–6) || Robin Roberts (8–11) || None || 34,673 || 44–70
|- style="background:#fbb"
| 115 || August 17 || @ Pirates || 3–5 || Harvey Haddix (8–7) || John Buzhardt (4–11) || Clem Labine (4) || 33,598 || 44–71
|- style="background:#fbb"
| 116 || August 18 || @ Braves || 0–1 || Lew Burdette (14–7) || Gene Conley (7–10) || None || 16,338 || 44–72
|- style="background:#bfb"
| 117 || August 19 || @ Braves || 3–2 || Art Mahaffey (2–0) || Juan Pizarro (6–6) || None || 14,723 || 45–72
|- style="background:#fbb"
| 118 || August 20 || @ Braves || 0–1 || Bob Buhl (12–6) || Robin Roberts (8–12) || None || 23,985 || 45–73
|- style="background:#fbb"
| 119 || August 21 || @ Braves || 2–3 || Warren Spahn (15–7) || John Buzhardt (4–12) || None || 23,169 || 45–74
|- style="background:#fbb"
| 120 || August 23 || @ Cardinals || 2–4 || Ray Sadecki (7–7) || Gene Conley (7–11) || Lindy McDaniel (20) || 13,283 || 45–75
|- style="background:#bfb"
| 121 || August 24 || @ Cardinals || 5–3 || Art Mahaffey (3–0) || Larry Jackson (11–14) || Chris Short (2) || 10,636 || 46–75
|- style="background:#bfb"
| 122 || August 26 || @ Cubs || 4–2 || Robin Roberts (9–12) || Bob Anderson (7–8) || None || 5,021 || 47–75
|- style="background:#fbb"
| 123 || August 27 || @ Cubs || 4–5 || Don Elston (7–7) || Chris Short (5–9) || None || 9,657 || 47–76
|- style="background:#fbb"
| 124 || August 28 || @ Cubs || 6–8 || Don Cardwell (6–12) || Gene Conley (7–12) || Joe Schaffernoth (3) || 11,383 || 47–77
|- style="background:#bfb"
| 125 || August 29 || @ Giants || 2–0 || Art Mahaffey (4–0) || Mike McCormick (11–10) || None || 10,062 || 48–77
|- style="background:#fbb"
| 126 || August 30 || @ Giants || 1–2 || Sam Jones (15–14) || Robin Roberts (9–13) || None || 7,014 || 48–78
|- style="background:#fbb"
| 127 || August 31 || @ Dodgers || 1–3 || Roger Craig (6–1) || John Buzhardt (4–13) || None || 12,586 || 48–79
|-

|- style="background:#fbb"
| 128 || September 1 || @ Dodgers || 2–3 (11) || Don Drysdale (12–13) || Turk Farrell (9–5) || None || 28,946 || 48–80
|- style="background:#bfb"
| 129 || September 3 || @ Pirates || 3–2 || Art Mahaffey (5–0) || Vern Law (19–6) || None || 18,487 || 49–80
|- style="background:#fbb"
| 130 || September 4 || @ Pirates || 3–5 || Vinegar Bend Mizell (10–7) || Jim Owens (3–12) || Clem Labine (6) || 17,856 || 49–81
|- style="background:#fbb"
| 131 || September 5 || Reds || 2–9 || Bob Purkey (16–8) || Robin Roberts (9–14) || None || 8,979 || 49–82
|- style="background:#fbb"
| 132 || September 6 || Reds || 1–6 (10) || Jim Brosnan (7–2) || John Buzhardt (4–14) || None || 4,396 || 49–83
|- style="background:#bfb"
| 133 || September 7 || Cubs || 2–0 || Gene Conley (8–12) || Don Cardwell (7–13) || None || 3,323 || 50–83
|- style="background:#fbb"
| 134 || September 8 || Cubs || 1–2 || Glen Hobbie (14–17) || Art Mahaffey (5–1) || None || 3,808 || 50–84
|- style="background:#fbb"
| 135 || September 9 || Cardinals || 1–5 (5) || Larry Jackson (16–12) || Robin Roberts (9–15) || None || 18,677 || 50–85
|- style="background:#bfb"
| 136 || September 10 || Cardinals || 7–2 || Jim Owens (4–12) || Ray Sadecki (8–8) || None || 6,444 || 51–85
|- style="background:#fbb"
| 137 || September 11 || Cardinals || 3–7 || Curt Simmons (7–3) || John Buzhardt (4–15) || Lindy McDaniel (24) || 3,722 || 51–86
|- style="background:#bbb"
| – || September 12 || Dodgers || colspan=6 | Postponed (rain; Hurricane Donna); Makeup: September 13 as a traditional double-header
|- style="background:#fbb"
| 138 || September 13 (1) || Dodgers || 1–2 (10) || Johnny Podres (12–11) || Gene Conley (8–13) || Larry Sherry (7) || see 2nd game || 51–87
|- style="background:#fbb"
| 139 || September 13 (2) || Dodgers || 1–4 || Sandy Koufax (8–12) || Art Mahaffey (5–2) || None || 7,559 || 51–88
|- style="background:#bfb"
| 140 || September 14 || Giants || 5–1 || Robin Roberts (10–15) || Billy O'Dell (7–12) || None || 4,432 || 52–88
|- style="background:#fbb"
| 141 || September 15 || Giants || 6–8 (11) || Johnny Antonelli (6–7) || Turk Farrell (9–6) || Billy Loes (5) || 4,847 || 52–89
|- style="background:#fbb"
| 142 || September 16 || @ Braves || 0–4 || Warren Spahn (20–9) || John Buzhardt (4–16) || None || 6,117 || 52–90
|- style="background:#bfb"
| 143 || September 17 || @ Braves || 5–2 (10) || Turk Farrell (10–6) || Ron Piché (2–5) || Chris Short (3) || 11,523 || 53–90
|- style="background:#fbb"
| 144 || September 18 || @ Braves || 1–7 (8) || Joey Jay (9–7) || Art Mahaffey (5–3) || None || 10,561 || 53–91
|- style="background:#fbb"
| 145 || September 20 (1) || Pirates || 1–7 || Bob Friend (17–11) || Robin Roberts (10–16) || None || see 2nd game || 53–92
|- style="background:#fbb"
| 146 || September 20 (2) || Pirates || 2–3 || Clem Labine (3–4) || Jim Owens (4–13) || None || 17,216 || 53–93
|- style="background:#bfb"
| 147 || September 23 || @ Reds || 6–1 || John Buzhardt (5–16) || Bob Purkey (17–10) || None || 3,919 || 54–93
|- style="background:#fbb"
| 148 || September 24 || @ Reds || 0–5 || Jim Maloney (2–5) || Gene Conley (8–14) || None || 2,798 || 54–94
|- style="background:#bfb"
| 149 || September 25 || @ Reds || 7–1 || Art Mahaffey (6–3) || Jay Hook (11–18) || None || 7,178 || 55–94
|- style="background:#bfb"
| 150 || September 27 || Braves || 5–3 || Robin Roberts (11–16) || Joey Jay (9–8) || Turk Farrell (11) || 4,060 || 56–94
|- style="background:#fbb"
| 151 || September 28 || Braves || 3–9 || Lew Burdette (19–12) || Jim Owens (4–14) || None || 2,884 || 56–95
|- style="background:#bfb"
| 152 || September 30 || Reds || 7–6 (14) || Chris Short (6–9) || Orlando Peña (0–1) || None || 3,370 || 57–95
|-

|- style="background:#bfb"
| 153 || October 1 || Reds || 7–3 || Robin Roberts (12–16) || Jim Maloney (2–6) || None || 1,897 || 58–95
|- style="background:#bfb"
| 154 || October 2 || Reds || 6–1 || Art Mahaffey (7–3) || Bob Purkey (17–11) || None || 3,598 || 59–95
|-

| style="text-align:left;" |
The June 21, 1960 (game 2), game was protested by the Cubs in the bottom of the fifth inning. The protest was later denied.
The June 21 game was suspended at the end of the eighth inning with the score 7–5 and was completed June 22, 1960.

Roster

Player stats

Batting

Starters by position 
Note: Pos = Position; G = Games played; AB = At bats; H = Hits; Avg. = Batting average; HR = Home runs; RBI = Runs batted in

Other batters 
Note: G = Games played; AB = At bats; H = Hits; Avg. = Batting average; HR = Home runs; RBI = Runs batted in

Pitching

Starting pitchers 
Note: G = Games pitched; IP = Innings pitched; W = Wins; L = Losses; ERA = Earned run average; SO = Strikeouts

Other pitchers 
Note: G = Games pitched; IP = Innings pitched; W = Wins; L = Losses; ERA = Earned run average; SO = Strikeouts

Relief pitchers 
Note: G = Games pitched; W = Wins; L = Losses; SV = Saves; ERA = Earned run average; SO = Strikeouts

Farm system 

LEAGUE CO-CHAMPIONS: Williamsport

Notes

References 
1960 Philadelphia Phillies season at Baseball Reference

Philadelphia Phillies seasons
Philadelphia Phillies season
Philadelph